Resurrection is the debut studio album by Chris Pérez Band. It was released on May 18, 1999. The album is based on songs that Selena, his deceased wife, inspired Perez to write after her death. The  song, "Best I Can", was specifically written by Perez to his wife, Selena. Overall Perez revealed that the songs in the album are dedicated to her.
At the 2000 Grammy Awards it won the Grammy Award for Best Latin Rock/Alternative Album.  In 2002, Chris Pérez Band made their final album called Una Noche Más.

Track listing

References

1999 debut albums
Grammy Award for Best Latin Rock, Urban or Alternative Album